Banco Best is a Portuguese financial institution based in Lisbon and created in 2001. It operates in the areas of Banking, Asset Management and Trading. Shareholders of Banco Best is Novo Banco.

Banco Best's headquarters is located in Lisbon. Investment Centres are located in Braga, Guimarães, Porto, Aveiro, Viana do Castelo, Leiria, Lisbon, and Faro.

Website 

 www.bancobest.pt

Banks of Portugal